Cranoglanis bouderius is a species of armorhead catfish found in Kwangsi Province, China and Vietnam. It is considered to be a fine food fish in the Zhujiang River Valley in China. It lives in clear water rivers and its diet consists of shrimps and small fishes.

References 

 

Catfish of Asia
Freshwater fish of China
Fish of Vietnam
Fish described in 1846